Lasionycta dolosa is a moth of the family Noctuidae first described by William Barnes and Foster Hendrickson Benjamin in 1923. It is found in the Rocky Mountains of Colorado.

It is diurnal and occurs above the timberline.

Adults are on wing from early July to mid-August.

External links
A Revision of Lasionycta Aurivillius (Lepidoptera, Noctuidae) for North America and notes on Eurasian species, with descriptions of 17 new species, 6 new subspecies, a new genus, and two new species of Tricholita Grote

Lasionycta
Moths described in 1923